Shih Hui-fen is a Taiwanese politician. She was the Deputy Minister of Mainland Affairs Council from 2014 to 2016.

Education
Shih received her bachelor's degree in law from National Taiwan University and her master's degree in social science from the same university.

References

Living people
National Taiwan University alumni
Political office-holders in the Republic of China on Taiwan
Year of birth missing (living people)